Bulgaria is divided into 31 multi-member constituencies for the purposes of elections to the National Assembly.

Background
Bulgaria is divided into 28 provinces. Most of these correspond exactly to the constituencies, but Sofia City Province is divided in 3 and Plovdiv Province is divided in 2. Plovdiv Province is divided between the 16th MMC (consisting of the City of Plovdiv) and the 17th MMC (consisting of the rest of the province). Sofia City Province (not to be confused with Sofia Province) is divided between the 23rd (southern Sofia), 24th (central and eastern Sofia), and 25th (western Sofia) MMCs.

In addition to their names, constituencies are numbered from 1 to 31 according to their order in the Cyrillic alphabet. There are a total of 240 seats in the National Assembly, and each constituency elects between 4 (the guaranteed minimum number of seats in a constituency) and 16 members of parliament.

List of constituencies

 1st MMC – Blagoevgrad
 2nd MMC – Burgas
 3rd MMC – Varna
 4th MMC – Veliko Tarnovo
 5th MMC – Vidin
 6th MMC – Vratsa
 7th MMC – Gabrovo
 8th MMC – Dobrich
 9th MMC – Kardzhali
 10th MMC – Kyustendil
 11th MMC – Lovech
 12th MMC – Montana
 13th MMC – Pazardzhik
 14th MMC – Pernik
 15th MMC – Pleven
 16th MMC – Plovdiv-city
 17th MMC – Plovdiv-province
 18th MMC – Razgrad
 19th MMC – Ruse
 20th MMC – Silistra
 21st MMC – Sliven
 22nd MMC – Smolyan
 23rd MMC – Sofia-city 23
 24th MMC – Sofia-city 24
 25th MMC – Sofia-city 25
 26th MMC – Sofia-province
 27th MMC – Stara Zagora
 28th MMC – Targovishte
 29th MMC – Haskovo
 30th MMC – Shumen
 31st MMC – Yambol

Seat allocation by constituency
Below is the numbers of MPs allocated to each constituency by election year. The number of MPs in 2009 only adds up to 209 because of the electoral system experiment of that year (see further below).

2009 experiment

As an experiment, the 2009 election was conducted with a different electoral system than earlier elections. 31 out of the 240 MPs were elected through first-past-the-post voting, while the remaining 209 were elected through party-list proportional representation using the largest remainder method. This mixed electoral system was rejected for use in further elections, and the old system was returned in the next election in 2013.

The following 31 members of the National Assembly were elected through first-past-the-post in 2009:

See also
Bulgaria, the single nationwide constituency for elections to the European Parliament
Elections in Bulgaria
Politics of Bulgaria
The provinces of Bulgaria, on which the constituencies are based

Sources

Bulgaria

Constituencies